Mauzy is an unincorporated community in Union Township, Rush County, in the U.S. state of Indiana.

History
An old variant name of the community was called Griffin Station. William Mauzy worked as a teacher near the old Griffin Station.

A post office was established at Mauzy in 1884, and remained in operation until it was discontinued in 1905.

Geography

References

Unincorporated communities in Rush County, Indiana
Unincorporated communities in Indiana